A. carvalhoi may refer to:

 Aechmea carvalhoi, a bromeliaceae species endemic to Brazil
 Amphisbaena carvalhoi, a worm lizard species found in Brazil

See also
 Carvalhoi (disambiguation)